Gerard Kendrick Marino (born April 1, 1968) is a film and video game score composer, most notably contributing heavily to the God of War series.

His work is featured on the soundtracks of the God of War series, including God of War, God of War II, God of War: Chains of Olympus, God of War III, and God of War: Ghost of Sparta. For God of War II, he was nominated for a BAFTA Award. He also worked on Activision games like Gun, Spider-Man Edge of Time and The Amazing Spider-Man. He has worked on several film and television series since 2000, generally listed as composing additional music for the soundtracks.

References

External links
 Official website
 

1968 births
American film score composers
American television composers
Living people
American male film score composers
Male television composers
Video game composers